is a Japanese josei manga series written and illustrated by Natsumi Ando. It was serialized in Kodansha's Be Love magazine beginning on December 1, 2016, and collected into 16 tankōbon volumes, ending on July 30, 2021. The series had two million volumes in print as of March 2020 and five million as of September 2021. A live-action Japanese television drama adaptation premiered on Nippon TV since August 12, 2020, starring Minami Hamabe and Ryusei Yokohama.

References

External links
  
  

2020 Japanese television series debuts
Anime and manga about revenge
Wrongful convictions in fiction
Nippon TV dramas
Japanese television dramas based on manga
Thriller television series
Confectionery in fiction
Kodansha manga
Josei manga